Orthocomotis longicilia is a species of moth of the family Tortricidae. It is found in Costa Rica and Venezuela.

The length of the forewings 10.5-11.5 mm. The ground colour of the forewings is whitish, overscaled with patches of gold and steel grey. The hindwings are dark brown.

Etymology
The species name refers to the elongate cilia of the male antennae.

References

Moths described in 2003
Orthocomotis